Steven Millhauser (born August 3, 1943) is an American novelist and short story writer.  He won the 1997 Pulitzer Prize for Fiction for his novel Martin Dressler.

Life and career
Millhauser was born in New York City, grew up in Connecticut, and earned a B.A. from Columbia University in 1965.  He then pursued a doctorate in English at Brown University. He never completed his dissertation but wrote parts of Edwin Mullhouse and From the Realm of Morpheus in two separate stays at Brown.  Between times at the university, he wrote Portrait of a Romantic at his parents' house in Connecticut.  His story "The Invention of Robert Herendeen" (in The Barnum Museum) features a failed student who has moved back in with his parents; the story is loosely based on this period of Millhauser's life.

Until the Pulitzer Prize, Millhauser was best known for his 1972 debut novel, Edwin Mullhouse. This novel, about a precocious writer whose career ends abruptly with his death at age eleven, features the fictional Jeffrey Cartwright playing Boswell to Edwin's Johnson. Edwin Mullhouse brought critical acclaim, and Millhauser followed with a second novel, Portrait of a Romantic, in 1977, and his first collection of short stories, In The Penny Arcade, in 1986.

Possibly the most well-known of his short stories is "Eisenheim the Illusionist" (published in "The Barnum Museum"), based on a pseudo-mythical tale of a magician who stunned audiences in Vienna in the latter part of the 19th century. It was made into the film The Illusionist (2006).

Millhauser's stories often treat fantasy themes in a manner reminiscent of Poe or Borges, with a distinctively American voice. As critic Russell Potter has noted, "In (Millhauser's stories), mechanical cowboys at penny arcades come to life; curious amusement parks, museums, or catacombs beckon with secret passageways and walking automata; dreamers dream and children fly out their windows at night on magic carpets."

Millhauser's collections of stories continued with The Barnum Museum (1990), Little Kingdoms (1993), and The Knife Thrower and Other Stories (1998). The unexpected success of Martin Dressler in 1997 brought him increased attention. Dangerous Laughter: Thirteen Stories made the New York Times Book Review list of 10 Best Books of 2008.

Personal life
Millhauser lives in Saratoga Springs, New York. He taught at Skidmore College for almost 30 years before retiring in 2017. He was previously married to Cathy Allis, an occupational therapist and crossword constructor.

Awards and honors
2012 The Story Prize, We Others
1997 Pulitzer Prize for Fiction, Martin Dressler

Bibliography

Novels
 
Portrait of a Romantic (1977) 
From the Realm of Morpheus (1986) 
Martin Dressler: The Tale of an American Dreamer (1996)

Short fiction
Collections
In the Penny Arcade (1986) 
The Barnum Museum (1990) 
Little Kingdoms (1993) (Novellas) 
The Knife Thrower (1998) 
Enchanted Night (1999) (Novella) 
The King in the Tree: Three Novellas (2003) 
Dangerous Laughter: Thirteen Stories (2008) 
We Others: New and Selected Stories (2011) 
Voices in the Night (Alfred A. Knopf, April 2015)
Stories

Critical studies and reviews of Millhauser's work
Understanding Steven Millhauser (Understanding Contemporary American Fiction), by Earl G. Ingersoll. University of South Carolina Press, 2014 
Steven Millhauser : la précision de l'impossible, by Marc Chénetier. Paris: Belin, 2013 ISSN 1275-0018

Notes

External links
Interview conducted by Etienne Février for Transatlantica (2011)
Interview conducted by Jim Shepard for BOMB Magazine (2003)
Interview conducted by Marc Chénetier for Transatlantica (2003)
 

Excerpt from Enchanted Night

1943 births
Living people
20th-century American novelists
20th-century American short story writers
21st-century American novelists
21st-century American short story writers
American male novelists
American male short story writers
Columbia College (New York) alumni
People from Saratoga Springs, New York
Postmodern writers
Prix Médicis étranger winners
Pulitzer Prize for Fiction winners
Skidmore College faculty
The New Yorker people
World Fantasy Award-winning writers
Novelists from Connecticut
PEN/Faulkner Award for Fiction winners
20th-century American male writers
21st-century American male writers
Novelists from New York (state)